The 1926 United States Senate election in Vermont took place on November 2, 1926. Republican Porter H. Dale successfully ran for re-election to a full term in the United States Senate, defeating Democratic candidate James E. Kennedy.

Republican primary

Results

Democratic primary

Results

General election

Results

References

Vermont
1926
1926 Vermont elections